Ctenactis is a genus of solitary disc corals in the family Fungiidae. Members of this genus are found in the Indo-Pacific region.

Characteristics
Members of this genus are medium to large oval disc corals. They have an axial furrow with usually a single mouth opening, though sometimes there are several mouths. The septa are heavily toothed with sharp triangular teeth. The costae are weakly developed and have long arborescent spines.

Species
The World Register of Marine Species currently lists the following species:

Ctenactis albitentaculata Hoeksema, 1989
Ctenactis crassa (Dana, 1846)
Ctenactis echinata (Pallas, 1766)

References

Fungiidae
Scleractinia genera
Cnidarians of the Indian Ocean
Cnidarians of the Pacific Ocean
Marine fauna of Asia
Marine fauna of Oceania
Marine fauna of Southeast Asia
Taxa named by Addison Emery Verrill